Muster may refer to:

Military terminology
 Muster (military), a process or event for the accounting for members in a military unit
 Muster list, list of the functions for team members
 A mustering, in military terminology, is a specialised formation, similar to an administrative corps

People
 Bill Muster (1926–1989), photographer, publisher, and marketing executive in Los Angeles
 Brad Muster (born 1965), former American football fullback
 Miki Muster (1925–2018), Slovenian cartoonist and animator
 Peter Muster (born 1952), Swiss sprinter
 Thomas Muster (born 1967), former World Number 1 tennis player

Places
 Mustér, the Romansh name for the municipality of Disentis, Switzerland

Other uses
 Muster drill, also known as a lifeboat drill 
 Muster (livestock), the rounding-up of livestock
 Muster (grape), another name for the Italian wine grape Avarengo
 Muster (event), a competitive skills event held between fire departments
 Muster (census), an official population count, conducted by a government
 Muster (Texas A&M University), a tradition at Texas A&M University in the US.
 Ute muster, an auto show

See also
 Must (disambiguation)
 Musters, a surname (with a list of people of this name)